The Nizva is a river in Perm Krai, Russia, a left tributary of the Kolva, which in turn is a tributary of the Vishera. It flows into the Kolva  from the Kolva's mouth. The main tributaries are Baydach (left) and Vyrya (right).

References 

Rivers of Perm Krai